Mees may refer to:

People

Given name 
 Mees Bakker (born 2001), Dutch footballer
 Mees Erasmus (born 1994), South African rugby union player
 Mees Gerritsen (born 1939), Dutch track cyclist
 Mees Hoedemakers (born 1998), Dutch footballer
 Mees Kaandorp (born 1998), Dutch footballer
 Mees Siers (born 1987), Dutch footballer
 Mees de Wit (born 1998), Dutch footballer

Surname 
 Gerlof Mees (1926-2013), Dutch ornithologist
 Heleen Mees (born 1968), Dutch economist
 Helga Mees (1937-2014), German fencer
 Herman Mees (1880–1964), Dutch artist
 Jared Mees (born 1986), American motorcycle racer
 Jim Mees (1955–2013), American set designer
 Joshua Mees (born 1996), German footballer
 Jules Mees (1876–1937), Belgian historian
 Kenneth Mees (1882–1960), British-American physicist and photographic researcher
 Paul Mees (1961-2013), Australian planner and academic
 Philibert Mees (1929–2006), Flemish composer and pianist
 Tom Mees (1949–1996), American sports broadcaster
 Tom Mees (cricketer) (born 1981), English cricketer
 Victor Mees (1927-2012), Belgian footballer

Other uses 
Mees or MEES may also refer to:
 Mées, a town in the Landes department, France
 Mees (crater), a lunar crater
 C.E.K. Mees Observatory, an astronomical observatory
 Mees's nightjar (Caprimulgus meesi), a bird in the family Caprimulgidae
 Middle East Economic Survey, a weekly newsletter
 Mee's Bus Lines, Melbourne, Australia
Minimum Energy Efficiency Standards, applicable to private rented property in the United Kingdom under the MEES regulations

See also
 Les Mées (disambiguation)
 Mee (disambiguation)
 Mée (disambiguation)